Tannbach may refer to:

 Tannbach (Saale), a brook in north-east Bavaria and southern Thuringia, Germany
 Tannbach (TV series), a German television series